Freestone is an unincorporated community in Freestone County, in the U.S. state of Texas.

History
Freestone was originally called Bond's Prairie, and under the latter name had its start in 1905 when the railroad was extended to that point. A post office called Freestone was established in 1906, and remained in operation until 1975.

References

Unincorporated communities in Freestone County, Texas
Unincorporated communities in Texas